The Salisbury - Elk Lick School District is a public school district that serves Salisbury Borough and Elk Lick Township in Somerset County, Pennsylvania. It is located only two miles from the Mason-Dixion Line. The district encompasses approximately 60 square miles. According to 2000 federal census data, it serves a resident population of 3,171.

Facilities
Both the Elementary School and the Junior - Senior High School share a piece of land on Smith Avenue in Salisbury, PA.

Salisbury-Elk Lick Junior/Senior High School serves grades 7 to 12.

The Elementary School was erected in 1973, consolidating the Salisbury Borough, Boynton, Saint Paul, and Springs Schools. The building has all the modern amenities of a standard Elementary School.

References

External links
 Athletics Info
 School History
 Salisbury Borough

School districts in Somerset County, Pennsylvania
School districts established in 1954